Return to Bolivia is a 2008 Argentine film directed by Mariano Raffo, who also wrote the script in collaboration with Marina Boolls.

The film was nominated for 22 awards and won four of them.

Plot
Recounts the journey to their country of origin of a Bolivian family who lives in the neighborhood of Liniers, Buenos Aires, with a greengrocer. Related as a road-movie, the camera follows a pair of Bolivians with their three children, traveling to the edge of the boundary between Jujuy Province in Argentina and Tarija, Bolivia, and then go to a village in the highlands between Oruro and La Paz.
 Return to Bolivia is an auteur documentary film that tells the story of a Bolivian family in Buenos Aires that decides to return to Bolivia. The documentary is filmed in a verite style and it gives a personal account of the subject of immigration, allowing the characters to lead the story. The narrative is based on universal values using a clear style that brings the story very close to fiction.

Production
Shot with limited resources and a minimal film crew that included the director and the film's producer and soundman, Mariana Boolls. This production won several international awards, including the award for Best Foreign Film Festival Icaro XI of Guatemala and the Best Documentary Festival Gualeguaychú. It received positive reviews, like the Buenos Aires Heralds critic:

 (...)the intelligent narrative and the skilful editing make Return to Bolivia a remarkable documentary, not just from a technical point of view. Indeed, Return to Bolivia, more than just a camera following the travails of a group of people, is about life and death, death and life, the exploration of which is never easy.

Cast
 Janeth Cuiza as Janeth
 Brian Quispe Cuiza as Brian
 Camila Quispe Cuiza as Camila
 Jhoselyn Quispe Cuiza as Jhoselyn
 David Quispe as David

Awards

References

External links
 
 Buenos Aires Herald's critic
 Official website

2008 films
Argentine documentary films
Films directed by Mariano Raffo
Argentine independent films
Aymara-language films
2000s Spanish-language films
Quechua-language films
2008 documentary films
2008 independent films
2000s Argentine films
Films set in Bolivia